Curtze is a German surname. Notable people with the surname include:

 Charles A. Curtze (1911–2007), American admiral
 Maximilian Curtze (1837–1903), German mathematician and historian of mathematics

German-language surnames